Berry Bros. & Rudd (BBR) is a family-run British wine and spirits merchant founded in London, England, in 1698. Since then, the company has grown from a small coffee shop into an international business with six offices worldwide.

As well as the wines, such as en primeur from places like Bordeaux, Burgundy, the Rhône and Italy, the company also sells wines and spirits under its own-label range, Berry Bros. & Rudd's Own Selection.

Other services it offers include wine investment, wine storage, wine tastings, events and educational courses.

History

Berry Bros. & Rudd is Britain's oldest wine and spirits merchant, and one of the ten oldest family-run businesses in the United Kingdom. It was founded by the Widow Bourne in 1698 at 3 St. James's Street, London, which today is a Grade II* listed building still used as the company's headquarters. No.3, as it's known, contained Berry Bros. & Rudd's main retail premises until mid-2017, when these moved around the corner to a purpose-built shop at 63 Pall Mall. The company has a discounted store next to its main warehouse in Basingstoke, Hampshire and additional offices in Battersea as well as overseas in Japan, Hong Kong and Singapore.

The company started out selling coffee, and then diversified into cocoa, tea, snuff, spices, and other exotic goods, quickly becoming one of London's most fashionable grocers. Its West End location and close proximity to St James's Palace also contributed to its growing popularity. 
In 1903 they formulated a ginger liqueur to revivify Edward VII from cold car journeys, still purveyed as The King's Ginger.

During the years, it has counted many famous customers among its clientele including: Lord Byron, William Pitt the Younger, the Aga Khan and Beau Brummell.

In 2020, Emma Fox took on the role of CEO from Lizzy Rudd, who had been serving as interim Chief Executive since the departure of Dan Jago in 2019. Lizzy Rudd remains the Chair of the Board of Directors.

Royal Warrants 
Berry Bros. & Rudd has been the official wine supplier to the British Royal Family since the reign of King George III and received its first Royal Warrant of Appointment in 1903 from King Edward VII. Queen Elizabeth II granted the company her royal warrant in 1952, while Charles, Prince of Wales granted it his in 1998.

Basingstoke Warehouse 
In 1967, the company moved its bottling operation and warehouse to purpose-built facilities in Basingstoke, Hampshire. In spring 2014, it relaunched its warehouse shop on the site of the former bottling hall, the shop now sells bin-end and reduced price wines and spirits alongside a fine wine collection.

Cutty Sark Whisky 
In 1923 Berry Bros. & Rudd launched Cutty Sark Scotch whisky, whose yellow label became famous the world over. In 2010 the brand was sold to The Edrington Group; under the deal, Berry Bros. & Rudd acquired The Glenrothes single malt brand, which was then sold back to Edrington in 2017.

Berry Bros. & Rudd's Broking Exchange (BBX)

Berry Bros. & Rudd was the first wine merchant to open an online shop, launching bbr.com in 1995. Today it also has an online wine trading platform called BBX (Berry Bros. & Rudd's Broking Exchange). It enables customers to sell and trade their own wines if they are stored in the company's bonded warehouses. Today BBX is the world's most extensive online fine wine trading platform.

The Future of Wine report 
In May 2008, a team from Berry Bros. & Rudd, Jasper Morris, MW, Alun Griffiths MW, Simon Field MW, and David Berry Green, drew up a document of speculations into the state of the wine industry in the coming 50 years, The Future of Wine. Among the predictions for 2058 were suggestions that China may become one of the world's biggest producers, that grapes will be grown hydroponically in floating offshore vineyards, and honey bees could be trained to detect wine faults.

See also
King's Ginger

References

External links

 Official website

1698 establishments in England
British Royal Warrant holders
Buildings and structures in the City of Westminster
Companies established in 1698
Companies based in the City of Westminster
Family-owned companies of the United Kingdom
Grade II* listed buildings in the City of Westminster
Privately held companies of the United Kingdom
Shops in London
Wine retailers of the United Kingdom
Grade II* listed commercial buildings
Food and drink companies established in the 17th century